Berit Andnor (born 20 November 1954) is a Swedish Social Democratic politician. She was Minister for Social Affairs of Sweden 2004–2006.

Biography
Berit Andnor grew up in a working-class family in Gothenburg, and she and her sister was the first her family to be given the opportunity to obtain a higher education. She has a University Diploma in Social Work from the University College of Östersund (now Mid Sweden University) in Jämtland, and since then, she has been living in the region.

In the 1980s, she worked as director of social welfare services in Berg Municipality. In 1982, she was elected to the county council, and from 1986 to 1991, she sat on its executive board, the beginning of her career as a full-time politician. In 1991, she was elected to the Riksdag as a Member of Parliament. She chose to focus her work as a parliamentarian on gender equality issues and labour market policy.

Since then, Andnor has held a number of high-ranking posts, such as vice-president of the Council of Europe parliamentarian assembly, 1996–1998, and chair of the Swedish National Labour Market Board, 1997–2000. She has also been a member of theexecutive committee of National Federation of Social Democratic Women in Sweden from 1995 to 2003.

Still, her name was not very known to the public when Prime Minister Göran Persson made her Minister for Children and Families in 2002. On 1 November 2004, she became Minister for Social Affairs.

From October 2006 until 2010, she was the chairman of the Riksdags committee on the constitution, and after the 2010 election, she left the Riksdag.

In 2011, she was appointed governor of Blekinge County with a term from 1 October 2011 to 30 September 2017. She succeeded Gunvor Engström.

References

External links
Government Officies of Sweden – Berit Andnor
Berit Andnor's weblog
Berit Andnor at the Riksdag website 

1954 births
Living people
Politicians from Gothenburg
Members of the Riksdag from the Social Democrats
Swedish Ministers for Social Affairs
Members of the Riksdag 1991–1994
Members of the Riksdag 1994–1998
Members of the Riksdag 1998–2002
Members of the Riksdag 2002–2006
Members of the Riksdag 2006–2010
Governors of Blekinge County
Women members of the Riksdag
Swedish women bloggers
Women government ministers of Sweden
20th-century Swedish women politicians
20th-century Swedish politicians
21st-century Swedish women politicians
Mid Sweden University alumni
Swedish Ministers for Health
Women county governors of Sweden
Swedish Ministers for Nordic Cooperation